Estonia competed at the World Games 2017 in Wroclaw, Poland, from 20 July 2017 to 30 July 2017.

Competitors

Cue sports

Snooker – Andres Petrov

Dance sport

Standard dance – Ergo Lukk/Baile Orb

Orienteering

Kristo Heinmann
Evely Kaasiku
Kenny Kivikas
Annika Rihma

References 

Nations at the 2017 World Games
2017 in Estonian sport
2017